Blue Hill at Stone Barns is a restaurant at the Stone Barns Center for Food & Agriculture in Pocantico Hills, New York. The Hudson Valley restaurant is owned by Dan, David, and Laureen Barber, who also own the New York City Blue Hill restaurant.

About 
Blue Hill opened in 2004 and seats 88 people in what was a cow barn. The restaurant serves contemporary cuisine using local ingredients, with an emphasis on produce from the center's farm. Blue Hill staff also participate in the Stone Barns Center's education programs. In 2016, Eater rated Blue Hill at Stone Barns as the best restaurant in the United States. In 2019, the Michelin Guide expanded to include Westchester County, and gave the restaurant two Michelin Stars. It is the only restaurant in the county to receive any Michelin Stars.

In May 2020, due to the coronavirus pandemic, Barber launched the resourcED program at Blue Hill at Stone Barns restaurants which packaged ingredients from the Stone Barns farm and included directions for customers to cook themselves. The boxes were intended to keep the restaurant and their suppliers in business when they couldn't host diners.

In 2020, Dan Barber announced he would be stepping down from the kitchen of Blue Hill at Stone Barns and Blue Hill in Greenwich Village. The change happened in 2021, with the kitchens being led with a diversity-focused chef-in-residence concept. The new concept was a response to the Black Lives Matter protests bringing attention to structural inequities in the restaurant industry. As of 2022, Dan Barber has returned to leading the kitchen.

In 2022, Eater published an exposé on the restaurant's ethics, interviewing 45 people, including 20 former employees, alleging a hostile workplace, with low pay, high stress, 70-hour workweeks, abusive management, and ignorance of sexual assault claims. The article also highlights several examples of fraudulent practices  the restaurant claiming unique stories behind several of their dishes while taking shortcuts or deviating from what the staff was told to tell guests. Through crisis & reputation management firm Trident DMG, as well as defamation law firm Clare Locke, Blue Hill denied all allegations.

References

External links

 

2004 establishments in New York (state)
Pocantico Hills, New York
Restaurants established in 2004
Restaurants in New York (state)